Goonellabah is the eastern suburb of Lismore, New South Wales, Australia, and is on the Bruxner Highway. At the 2006 census, Goonellabah had a population of 12,527 people.

The City of Lismore has its main offices on Oliver Avenue in the suburb.  Kadina High School was established here in 1976.

Goonellabah has many sporting teams which compete in local competitions. These include football, table tennis, cricket, hockey, touch, and tennis.

Heritage listings
Goonellabah has a number of heritage-listed sites, including:
 562 Ballina Road: Tulloona

References

Towns in New South Wales
Northern Rivers
City of Lismore